National Route 469 is a national highway of Japan connecting Gotenba, Shizuoka and Nanbu, Yamanashi in Japan, with a total length of .

See also

References

469
Roads in Shizuoka Prefecture
Roads in Yamanashi Prefecture